Sir John Farley Spry (1910 – 17 May 1999) was Chief Justice of Gibraltar from 1976. He was Chief Justice of the British Ocean Territory (1981–1987) and of Saint Helena and its Dependencies (1983–1992). From 1991, he was president, British Antarctic Territory Court of Appeal, and a justice of the Court of Appeal of the Falkland Islands.

Spry was educated at The Perse School and Peterhouse, Cambridge, where he graduated B.A. in 1932.

References 

Chief justices of Gibraltar
1910 births
1999 deaths
Knights Bachelor
20th-century Gibraltarian judges